George Walter Fawcett (6 August 1929 – 10 December 2015) was a cricketer from Northern Ireland.

A right-handed batsman and wicket-keeper, he made his debut for Ireland against Scotland in June 1956 in a first-class match. He went on to play for Ireland on twelve occasions, his last match also coming against Scotland in June 1959.

Of his matches for Ireland, six had first-class status. In all matches for Ireland, he scored 87 runs at an average of 6.21, with a top score of 21 against Scotland in his debut match. As a wicket-keeper, he took twelve catches and six stumpings.

References

1929 births
2015 deaths
Cricketers from Northern Ireland
Irish cricketers
People from County Down
Wicket-keepers